Abhishek Kaushik (born 13 February 1985) is an Indian cricketer. He played First-class cricket and List A cricket for the Railways Sports Promotion Board XI from 2013 to 2015.

References

External links
 

1985 births
Living people